Wehrle may refer to:

People
 Ann E. Wehrle (born 1956), American astronomer
 Emilian Wehrle (1832–1896), German clockmaker
 Gottlieb Wehrle (1822–1886), American farmer and politician
 Hermann Josef Wehrle (1899–1944), German resistance member
 John O. Wehrle (born 1941), American artist
 Martin Wehrle (born 1970), German journalist and author
 Paul Wehrle (1921–2004), American medical researcher
 R. W. Wehrle, American naturalist
 Timo Wehrle (born 1996), German footballer
 Vincent de Paul Wehrle OSB (born 1855), Catholic bishop

Other uses
 A character in the 1954 West German Film Annie from Tharau
 Wehrle's salamander, a species of salamander endemic to the Eastern United States

See also
 Gautier–Wehrlé, a former French manufacturer of vehicles
 Wehrli, a surname
 Wehrlite, an ultramafic rock
 Werle, a fiefdom in the Holy Roman Empire
 Werley, Wisconsin, United States